Phylomictis is a moth genus of the family Depressariidae.

Species
 Phylomictis decretoria Lucas, 1900
 Phylomictis eclecta Turner, 1906
 Phylomictis idiotricha Meyrick, 1921
 Phylomictis leucopelta (Lower, 1902)
 Phylomictis lintearia Meyrick, 1921
 Phylomictis maligna Meyrick, 1890
 Phylomictis monochroma Lower, 1892
 Phylomictis palaeomorpha Turner, 1898
 Phylomictis sarcinopa Meyrick, 1920

References

 
Stenomatinae
Moth genera
Taxa named by Edward Meyrick